NHR may refer to:

 Isuzu NHR, a medium-duty truck
 Naro language
 National Helium Reserve, the strategic helium gas reserve of the United States
 Neuro Hypnotic Repatterning, a technique developed by Richard Bandler
 Newman/Haas Racing, a motor racing team
 Nohar railway station, in Rajasthan, India
 Non-Habitual Resident, in Portugal
 Northumberland Hospital Radio, a UK Registered Charity
 Nuclear hormone receptor